Belenky, feminine: Belenkaya is a Russian-language surname, typically of people of Jewish origin. In 1972 it was the 14th most common Jewish surname in Moscow and the 16th in Leningrad. 

The surname may refer to:

Valery Belenky, Soviet Azerbaijani/German artistic gymnast
Abram Belenky, Soviet secret service (Cheka/GPU/NKVD) leader
Dina Belenkaya, Russian chess player
Maya Belenkaya, Soviet figure skater

References

Russian-language surnames
Russian-Jewish surnames